Holbrook/Randolph station (also signed as Randolph/Holbrook) is an MBTA Commuter Rail station in Randolph, Massachusetts. It serves the Middleborough/Lakeville Line. It is located at the junction of Union and Center Streets near the border of Randolph and Holbrook.

From 1984 to 1988, the Cape Cod & Hyannis Railroad stopped near the current station site. Holbrook/Randolph station opened in September 1997; it is located on the Middleborough Main Line, opened in 1846 as the Fall River Railroad.

See also
List of Old Colony Railroad stations

References

External links
MBTA - Holbrook/Randolph
Station from Google Maps Street View

MBTA Commuter Rail stations in Norfolk County, Massachusetts
Stations along Old Colony Railroad lines
Railway stations in the United States opened in 1997